Egidijus Kavaliauskas (born June 29, 1988) is a Lithuanian professional boxer who challenged for the WBO welterweight title in 2019. At regional level, he held the WBC-NABF welterweight title from 2017 to 2019 and the WBO Inter-Continental welterweight title in 2018. As an amateur, he represented Lithuania at the 2008 and 2012 Olympic Games, and won a bronze medal at the 2011 World Championships.

Biography 
Kavaliauskas participated in 2008 at the Summer Olympics, but lost his first fight to bronze-winning Frenchman Alexis Vastine. In 2009 the boxer successfully started in the world championship and was among the eight strongest. In 2011 He won a gold medal in the Lithuanian championship. In the same year, Kavaliauskas participated in the world championship, where he reached the semifinals. In the finals competition, the athlete suffered a hand injury and won a bronze medal for not finishing the fight. Selected as the best of 2011 Lithuanian boxer.

Amateur career
 2004 – Cadet European Champs (Saratov, RUS) 3rd place – 52 kg.
 2005 – Cadet European Champs (Siofok, HUN) 3rd place – 54 kg.
 2005 – Lithuania Junior National Champs 3rd place – 54 kg.
 2006 – Danas Pozniakas Junior Tournament (Vilnius, LTU) 1st place – 60 kg.
 2006 – Lithuania Senior National Champs 2nd place – 60 kg.
 2006 – Brandenburg Junior Tournament (Frankfurt an der Oder, GER) 3rd place – 60 kg.
 2007 – Algirdas Socikas Tournament (Kaunas, LTU) 1st place – 60 kg.
 2007 – Grand Prix Ostrava (Ostrava, CZE) 3rd place – 64 kg.
 2007 – Slovakian Grand Prix (Vranov nad Toplou, SVK) 1st place – 69 kg.
 2008 – Bocskai Tournament (Debrecen, HUN) 3rd place – 64 kg Lost to Alexis Vastine (FRA) 13:10 in the semifinal; Won against Harun Sipahi (GER) 16:6 in the quarterfinal; Won against Tamas Balogh (HUN) RSC 4th round in the first preliminary round.
 2008 – Lithuania Senior National Champs 1st place.
 2008 – 1st European Olympic Qualification Tournament (Pescara, ITA) 3rd place – 64 kg Lost to Gyula Kate (HUN) 18:10 in the semifinal; Won against Boris Katalinic (CRO) 13:4 in the quarterfinal; Won against Aslanbek Kozayev (BLR) 17:9 in the second round; Won against Jussi Koivula (FIN) 23:5 in the first round.
 2008 – 2nd European Olympic Qualification Tournament (Athens, GRE) 2nd place – 64 kg Lost to John Joe Joyce (IRL) RSCI 2nd round in the final; Won against Boris Katalinic (CRO) 11:5 in the semifinal; Won against Levan Gvamichava (GEO) 17:8 in the quarterfinal; Won against Anatolie Andreev (MLD) 19:3 in the second round; Won against Carmine Cirillo (ITA) 4:1 in the first round.
 2008 – Grand Prix Ostrava (Ostrava, CZE) 3rd place – 64 kg Lost to Rosniel Iglesias (CUB) AB 2nd round in the semifinal.
 2009 – Chemistry Cup (Halle, GER) 2nd place – 64 kg.
 2009 – Lithuania Senior National Champs 1st place – 64 kg.
 2009 – Algirdas Socikas Tournament (Kaunas, LTU) 3rd place – 64 kg Lost to Vazgen Safaryants (BLR) 4:3 in the semifinal.
 2010 – Algirdas Socikas Tournament (Kaunas, LTU) 1st place – 69 kg.
 2010 – Amber Gloves Tournament (Kaliningrad, RUS) 1st place – 69 kg.
 2011 – Grand Prix Usti nad Labem (Usti nad Labem, CZE) 1st place – 69 kg Won against Konstantin Snigour (ISR) 1:0 in the final; Won against Robert Bilik (CZE) 2:1 in the semifinal; Won against Aleksey Galetich (BLR) 1:0 in the quarterfinal; Won against Jesse Ross (AUS) 7:0 in the first preliminary round.
 2011 – Feliks Stamm Tournament (Warsaw, POL) 1st place – 69 kg Won against Abdulkadir Koroglu (TUR) 12:5 in the final; Won against Maksim Chudakov (RUS) RSCI 3rd round in the semifinal; Won against Tomasz Kot (POL) 8:4 in the quarterfinal.
 2011 – Lithuanian National Championships 1st place – 69 kg.
 2011 – Liventsev Memorial Tournament (Minsk, BLR) 2nd place – 69 kg.
 2011 – AIBA World Championships (Baku, AZE) 3rd place – 69 kg Lost to Serik Sapiyev (KAZ) AB 2nd round in the semi-final; Won against Fred Evans (WAL) RSCH 2nd round in the quarter-final; Won against Roy Sheahan (IRL) 11:7 in the third preliminary round; Won against Robert Bilik (CZE) 15:4 in the second preliminary round; Won against Maimaitituersun Qiong (CHN) 20:16 in the first preliminary round.

Professional career

Kavaliauskas vs. Crawford 
On 14 December, 2019, Kavaliauskas faced WBO welterweight champion Terence Crawford. Kavaliauskas started off the fight well, almost knocking down Crawford in the second round. However, Crawford improved in the following rounds and managed to finish Kavaliasukas in the ninth round.

Kavaliauskas vs. Zewski 
In his next bout, Kavaliauskas faced Mikael Zewski, who was ranked #7 by the IBF and the WBO as well as #13 by the WBC. Kavaliauskas beat Zewski by technical knockout in the 8th round.

Kavaliauskas vs. Ortiz Jr 
In his next fight, Kavaliauskas faced Virgil Ortiz Jr. Ortiz Jr was ranked #9 by The Ring, #1 by the WBO, #4 by the WBC and #15 by the IBF at welterweight. Ortiz Jr beat Kavaliauskas by technical knockout in the 8th round.

Professional boxing record

References

External links
Bio

Egidijus Kavaliauskas - Profile, News Archive & Current Rankings at Box.Live

Sportspeople from Kaunas
Olympic boxers of Lithuania
Boxers at the 2008 Summer Olympics
Boxers at the 2012 Summer Olympics
Light-welterweight boxers
1988 births
Living people
AIBA World Boxing Championships medalists
Lithuanian male boxers